Small Group Research is a peer-reviewed academic journal that covers research in the field of social psychology, dealing with the psychology and  organizational behavior of small groups and communication processes within them. The editors-in-chief are Aaron M. Brower (University of Wisconsin) and Joann Keyton (North Carolina State University). It was established in 1970 and is currently published by SAGE Publications.

Abstracting and indexing 
Small Group Research is abstracted and indexed in Scopus and the Social Sciences Citation Index. According to the Journal Citation Reports, its 2017 impact factor is 1.163, ranking it 51st out of 64 journals in the category "Psychology, Social", 161th out of 209 journals in the category "Management", and 59th out of 82 journals in the category "Psychology, Applied".

References

External links 
 

SAGE Publishing academic journals
English-language journals
Bimonthly journals
Social psychology journals
Publications established in 1970